The men's qualification for football tournament at the 1978 All-Africa Games.

Qualification stage

Zone I (North Africa)
Morocco withdrew.

|}

Libya qualified by taking place Tunisia after it withdrew later. In addition, Algeria qualified as hosts.

Zone II (West Africa 1)
The tournament was held in Bamako, Mali. Gambia, Guinea, Guinea-Bissau and Senegal withdrew.

|}

Mali qualified.

Zone III (West Africa 2)
The tournament was held in Abidjan, Ivory Coast. Liberia and Sierra Leone withdrew.

|}

Ghana qualified.

Zone IV (West Africa 3)
The tournament was held in Lagos, Nigeria. Central African Republic, Niger, Togo and Upper Volta withdrew.

|}

Nigeria qualified.

Zone V (Central Africa)
The tournament was held in Cameroon.

Group A

Group B

Semifinals

Final

Cameroon qualified.

Zone VI (East Africa)
The tournament was held in Cairo, Egypt. Ethiopia and Kenya withdrew.

Group A

Group B

Final

Egypt qualified.

Zone VII (Southern Africa)
The tournament was held in Curepipe, Mauritius. Botswana, Lesotho, Madagascar, Swaziland and Zambia withdrew.

Malawi qualified.

Qualifying teams
The following countries have qualified for the final tournament:

External links
African Games 1978 - Rec.Sport.Soccer Statistics Foundation

Qualification
1978